"Death to fascism, freedom to the people!" was a Communist-led Yugoslav Partisan motto, afterward accepted as the official slogan of the entire resistance movement, that was often quoted in post-war Socialist Yugoslavia. It was also used as a greeting formulation among the movement members both in official and unofficial correspondence during the war and for a few subsequent years, often abbreviated as "SFSN!" when written and accompanied by the clenched fist salute when spoken (one person usually saying "Smrt fašizmu!", the other responding with "Sloboda narodu!").

History
The slogan became popular after the execution of Stjepan Filipović, a Yugoslav Partisan. As the rope was put around his neck on 22 May 1942, Filipović defiantly thrust his hands out and denounced the Germans and their Axis allies as murderers, shouting "Death to fascism, freedom to the people!". At this moment, a subsequently-famous photograph was taken from which a statue was cast.

The slogan was part of the Communist Party of Yugoslavia's 1941 call to arms for the people of Yugoslavia. The Bulletin of the Partisan Supreme Headquarters uses the slogan in its first issue dated 16 August 1941.

See also
 Yugoslav Partisans

References

Anti-fascism in Yugoslavia
Last words
1940s neologisms
Quotations from military
Political catchphrases
Yugoslav Partisans
Yugoslavia in World War II